O'Koyea Dickson  (born February 9, 1990) is an American professional former baseball outfielder. He played in Major League Baseball (MLB) for the Los Angeles Dodgers during the 2017 season, and the Tohoku Rakuten Golden Eagles of Nippon Professional Baseball (NPB) in 2018.

Amateur career
Dickson graduated from George Washington High School in San Francisco, California, where he was the Player of the Year in 2008. As a sophomore at George Washington High, playing in the city championship game, he became the first high school player to hit a home run in AT&T Park. He hit a ground rule double his next at-bat.

After graduating from George Washington, Dickson attended College of San Mateo, where he was an All-American as a sophomore and helped lead his team to consecutive league titles. For his junior year, he transferred to Sonoma State University. He led the California Collegiate Athletic Association in runs scored and helped take his team to the NCAA Division II Baseball Championship.

Professional career

Los Angeles Dodgers

The Los Angeles Dodgers selected Dickson in the 12th round of the 2011 MLB Draft. He spent 2011 with the Ogden Raptors and 2012 with the Great Lakes Loons. He hit .280 with 15 homers and 88 RBI in 2013 with the Rancho Cucamonga Quakes of the California League.  In 2014, he played with the AA Chattanooga Lookouts of the Southern League, where he hit .269 with 17 homers and 73 RBI  and scored an invite to spring training for 2015. He was assigned to the AAA Oklahoma City Dodgers. He appeared in 117 games and hit .262 with 12 homers and 50 RBI.  In 2016, he remained with Oklahoma City and hit .328 with 18 homers and 64 RBIs in 101 games. In 2017, he played in 116 games and hit .246 with 24 homers and 76 RBI for Oklahoma City.

The Dodgers promoted Dickson to the major leagues for the first time on September 1, 2017. He made his major league debut the following day as the starting leftfielder and was hitless in three at-bats with one walk. He appeared in a total of seven games and had one hit in seven at-bats for the Dodgers. His first major league hit was a single to centerfield off of Madison Bumgarner of the San Francisco Giants on September 23, 2017. He suffered a shoulder injury late in the month and was placed on the disabled list. Dickson was outrighted to the minors and removed from the 40-man roster on November 6, 2017.

Tohoku Rakuten Golden Eagles
On December 26, 2017, Dickson signed a contract with the Tohoku Rakuten Golden Eagles of Nippon Professional Baseball (NPB). He became a free agent following the 2018 season.

Washington Nationals
On February 15, 2019, Dickson signed a minor league contract with the Washington Nationals. He was released on May 14, 2019.

Sugar Land Skeeters
On June 3, 2019, Dickson signed with the Sugar Land Skeeters of the Atlantic League of Professional Baseball.

Generales de Durango
On June 25, 2019, Dickson's contract was purchased by the Generales de Durango of the Mexican League. He was released on July 29, 2019.

Vallejo Admirals
On August 3, 2019, Dickson signed with the Vallejo Admirals of the Pacific Association.

References

External links

1990 births
Living people
American expatriate baseball players in Japan
American expatriate baseball players in Mexico
African-American baseball players
Águilas de Mexicali players
Baseball players from San Francisco
Chattanooga Lookouts players
Generales de Durango players
Great Lakes Loons players
Los Angeles Dodgers players
Major League Baseball outfielders
Naranjeros de Hermosillo players
Nippon Professional Baseball outfielders
Ogden Raptors players
Oklahoma City Dodgers players
Rancho Cucamonga Quakes players
San Mateo Bulldogs baseball players
Sonoma State Seawolves baseball players
Sugar Land Skeeters players
Tigres de Aragua players
American expatriate baseball players in Venezuela
Tohoku Rakuten Golden Eagles players
Vallejo Admirals players
21st-century African-American sportspeople
Minor league baseball coaches
Anchorage Glacier Pilots players